Prosthetics, the artificial replacement of organic limbs or organs, often play a role in fiction, particularly science fiction, as either plot points or to give a character a beyond normal appearance. Numerous works of literature, television, and films feature characters who have prosthetics attached.

Prosthetics are used, in a narrative sense, to either, provide a plot point in the characters back-story, a plot point to give to character a disability (or more often in Science fiction, an advantage), or just to distinguish the character in some way. Having a character in a story with a prostheses, can sometimes be the whole point of the story (e.g. Robocop is a full-body cyborg of police officer Alex Murphy, in essence he is a human/robot police officer, which is the basic premise for the film).

Science fiction characters
Science fiction literature, television, and films often feature characters with prosthetics.

Star Trek
 Geordi La Forge - Blind from birth, La Forge received prosthetics that allowed him to see. During the television series and Star Trek Generations, he had bio-implants along with an external VISOR prosthetic.
 Jean-Luc Picard - Early in his career, Picard was stabbed through the heart during a fight and required the implantation of an artificial heart to save his life. At the end of the third season, he was abducted and assimilated by the Borg. The Borg attached numerous prosthetics to Picard against his will.
 Seven of Nine - Originally a young human female known as Annika Hansen, she and her parents were captured by the Borg when Annika was six. She was also assimilated into the Borg Collective, where numerous prosthetics were attached to her. After she was separated from the collective and taken aboard Voyager as a crew member, most of the prosthetics were removed except for the ones on/near her left hand, left eye, and right ear.
 Nog - the Ferengi Ensign, the first of his kind in Starfleet, lost his leg during hostilities with the Dominion; an artificial leg was later installed and Nog had a prolonged psychological recovery.

Star Wars
 Anakin Skywalker / Darth Vader - Anakin Skywalker lost his right arm during the Battle of Geonosis when he dueled with Count Dooku. Afterwards, he received a replacement arm and hand. After becoming Darth Vader, Vader fought with Obi-Wan Kenobi which resulted in his losing both legs and his other arm. He also suffered severe burns in the aftermath of the battle which damaged his lungs and ear drums. Vader was forced to wear a breathing mask and monitor to compensate for his heavily damaged lungs, and was fitted with prosthetic limbs to replace those lost. His right hand was cut off again in Return of the Jedi.
 Luke Skywalker - Anakin's son Luke Skywalker lost his right hand when he dueled Darth Vader at Cloud City. Luke was rescued by his friends, and was then fitted with a prosthetic hand.
 General Grievous - Formerly a Kaleesh general, he was severely wounded in a shuttle bombing. He was later reconstructed by the Intergalactic Banking Clan as a cyborg, with his only organic remains encased inside a synthflesh sack within his durasteel skeleton.

Babylon 5
 G'Kar - While being held by Centauri forces, G'Kar lost his left eye after a Centauri guard cut it out. After being freed by Londo Mollari in the wake of the insane Emperor Cartagia's death, G'Kar was fitted with a replacement eye by Dr. Franklin. Initially, he had a human blue eye, this was later replaced with a red eye that looked like a natural Narn eye.

RoboCop
 In the first RoboCop film, Detroit police officer Alex Murphy was shot numerous times by a group of criminals and mortally wounded. His body was taken by OCP scientists - who then took his brain, eyes, peripheral nervous system and possibly other portions of his body and installed them inside an artificial, titanium-armored humanoid body. As intended, he became the cyborg Robocop.
 In the second film, criminal leader and drug addict Kane underwent a similar treatment; he became the hulking and nearly indestructible Robocop II, but was still psychotic and addicted to the drug Nuke.

Kingsman: The Secret Service
 In the movie Kingsman: The Secret Service, Gazelle, the assistant and right-hand of Richmond Valentine, has a pair of blade-equipped prosthetic legs that she uses that dispatch her enemies.
 In the 2017 sequel Kingsman: The Golden Circle, Charlie Hesketh, a former Kingsman trainee turned enforcer for drug kingpin Poppy Adams, wears a prosthetic arm to replace the one he lost during the Kingsman assault on Valentine's compound. Even when detached from his body, the arm can be operated via remote control and hack into the Kingsman computer system.

Other fiction
In Homestuck, Vriska Serket loses her eye and arm in an explosion. She receives a robotic arm from Equius Zahhak to replace it.

In Evil Dead, the main character Ash Williams has a chainsaw hand and later receives a mechanical hand in Army of Darkness.

In the myriad of Peter Pan stories and franchises, Captain Hook has a hook replacing his right hand which was eaten by a crocodile.

In Flannery O'Connor's story "Good Country People", the character Joy Hopewell/Hulga's leg was blasted off in a childhood hunting accidents and she used a wooden leg instead that becomes important to the plot.

In The Fugitive television series and subsequent film, the fugitive Dr. Richard Kimble searches for the one armed man who killed his wife. In the film version, the one armed man also received a transplant - who was played by Andreas Katsulas. As a result, this would be another role in addition to his Babylon 5 role in which he received a prosthetic device.

In the novel Moby-Dick, as well as various productions based on the novel, Captain Ahab is a man who loses one of his legs to the great sperm whale Moby Dick. After losing his leg, a replacement of sorts is fashioned. This `wooden leg´, actually carved out of whalebone, let him walk with minimal difficulty. The loss of this leg would fuel Ahab's obsession with Moby Dick, which cost him his ship, crew, and his life.

Mister Ming, the main antagonist of the Bob Morane books, has a robotic prosthesis instead of his right hand, which was lost during an attempt to steal a booby trapped gemstone.

In the manga and anime Ghost in the Shell, people whose bodies have been damaged or people who can simply afford it have their normal bodies replaced with a full prosthetic replacement. The main character, Motoko Kusanagi, is fully prosthetic. The Manga/Anime Galaxy Express 999 also features an array of main characters who have sacrificed their human bodies in order to occupy prosthetic machine bodies in order to become immortal. The 2011 video game Deus Ex: Human Revolution likewise centers around a future in which prosthetics have become commonplace.

The television series The Six Million Dollar Man and its spinoff The Bionic Woman both featured main characters whose replacement parts gave them abilities above those of normal people.

In the Harry Potter novel series, Alastor "Mad-Eye" Moody has an artificial eye (able to see through solids) and a wooden leg to compensate for wounds he received during his career as an Auror. Wormtail, Voldemort's assistant, also receives a replacement hand.

In the first-person shooter computer game Half-Life 2, Dr. Eli Vance uses a prosthetic leg after losing his own leg below the knee helping his colleague Dr. Isaac Kleiner over a wall while escaping Black Mesa in the original "Half-Life" game.

In the Kingpin (1996 film), Roy Munson has a prosthetic hook hand, after Roy is brutally beaten and loses his hand when it is forced into the ball return.

The character Rotwang from the film Metropolis has a black mechanical right hand after losing it for unknown reasons. Because Rotwang is an early "mad scientist" archetype, it is believed that this influenced other characters, such as Dr. Julius No (who, in the novel, had jointed metal claws; in the movie, however, he possessed actual artificial hands).

In the Akira manga and anime Tetsuo Shima, one of the main characters, loses his right arm and it is replaced by a mechanical limb. In the anime he's seen assembling the arm from pieces of junk using his supernatural powers, while in the manga the origin of the mechanical arm is unknown.

A running gag in the film Hot Shots! and its sequel is Lloyd Bridges's character, Thomas 'Tug' Bensen, featuring various prosthetics that replace parts he had lost in earlier battles. These prosthetics include; ceramic eyes, asbestos skin, a magnetic skull plate, aluminum siding facial bones, and stainless steel ear canals.

In the novel The Horse Whisperer (and the film of the same name), Grace MacLean loses part of her right leg when she is involved in a horseback riding accident, and struck by a large truck. She gets a prosthetic leg, and learns how to walk on it and ride again.

The character Peeta Mellark from The Hunger Games loses his left leg at the end of the novel, after surviving a bad wound and blood poisoning. However, when he is attacked by one of the Mutts, the wound is bad enough that it later causes the leg to be amputated by the capitol. He is given a replacement prosthetic leg.

In the manga and anime Black Butler, some of the members of the Noah's Ark Circus have prosthetic limbs. These people are Joker (Right hand), Beast (Left leg) and Dagger (Right leg). However, it is revealed that these limbs are in fact made from human bone. Also, Joker's prosthetic hand is shaped to look skeletal.

In the manga and anime Fullmetal Alchemist, the main protagonist Edward Elric loses his left leg in a failed attempt to resurrect his mother Trisha Elric through the use of human transmutation, a forbidden practice in alchemy, while his brother Alphonse Elric lost his whole body in the process. He then successfully used human transmutation once again to bind the soul of his brother to a suit of armor, losing his right arm in the process. Later he replaced the missing limbs with prosthetic limbs known as automail, which are robotic appendages that are connected to the very nerves in the human body, granting the user the ability to use them just as they would with their actual limbs.

In the How to Train Your Dragon film series, the main character, Hiccup, walks using a prosthetic foot after losing his real one during a battle at the end of the first film; his dragon has a prosthetic replacement for one side of its tailplane which it lost early or was missing from hatching. (The first film explains that the dragon's tail fin was lost when Hiccup attempted to capture and kill the dragon.)

In Metal Gear Solid V: The Phantom Pain the video game main character Punished "Venom" Snake is outfitted with a prosthetic Bionic Arm after a helicopter crash. Later in the game upgrades for the arm can be developed giving it the ability to fly like a missile as a "Rocket Punch", stun enemies with an electrical shock, or grab an enemy from far away with electromagnetic probes.

In A Song of Ice and Fire by George R.R. Martin, Jaime Lannister gets captured and maimed by the Brave Companions, a swellsword company, and loses his right hand, his sword hand. Being the best sword fighter in the Seven Kingdoms the loss of his hand means he loses more than just his hand. He has to re-invent himself. Back in Kings Landing with his family, he gets a prosthetic hand made of pure gold.

In the TV show ER, Dr. Romano's arm is amputated in Season 9 and in Season 10 he receives a robotic arm.

In the web series RWBY, Yang Xiao Long is enraged at the sight of Adam Taurus stabbing her partner Blake Belladonna in the torso, so she attempts to punch him. Unfortunately, this was unsuccessful as he had sliced off her right arm, which tore through her Aura and caused her to pass out. In Volume 4, her father then gets her a new prosthetic arm which was provided by General Ironwood. Near the end of the Volume, she spray paints her mechanical arm black and yellow.

In the film Captain America: The Winter Soldier after falling from a train in the prior Captain America film, a flashback shows James Buchanan "Bucky" Barnes being picked up by Hydra and his injured left arm is amputated and replaced with some kind of mechanical prosthetic. The prosthetic appears to be fairly advanced at the time, and maintains its advanced form throughout the film, even in the present. It appears to be extremely powerful, able to withstand Black Widow's electric taser darts with little effect, and makes him almost capable of outmatching Captain America. It's seen again in Civil War, and is replaced with a new arm that is implied heavily to be vibranium in Infinity War. Ulysses Klaue, a supervillain, has his arm chopped off by Ultron in Avengers: Age of Ultron and his replacement arm is made of vibranium.

In the young adult realistic fiction novel The Running Dream, the protagonist Jessica is a runner who loses a leg in a bus accident on her way home from a race. With the help of her community, Jessica's family saves enough money to buy her a prosthetic leg designed for running.

Stanisław Lem's 1955 science fiction comedy radio play Are you there, Mr. Jones? (and the 1969 BBC TV play Roly Poly based on it) humorously deals with a legal issue, a kind of the paradox of the heap: if a person gradually adds prostheses until the body is completely replaced, whether the person remains a human (with legal obligations of the such) or he becomes a machine (which cannot be sued, but can become someone's property).

In the TV series Adventure Time, Finn Mertens' right arm is amputated twice. Once in its 6th season and the second time in its 8th season.

In the Jojo's Bizarre Adventure manga and anime, the series' second titular character, Joseph Joestar, loses his left arm below the elbow in his final fight at the end of Part 2, at age 18. He is shown with a prosthetic hand at the end of Part 2 and throughout Part 3, though he is typically shown wearing gloves in Part 3 and it is never shown uncovered in Part 4.

In the video game Wolfenstein II: The New Colossus, Fergus Reid, if he was spared in the previous game, has his right arm severed during a struggle between Irene Engel and his daughter, Sigrun. He was given a prosthetic arm, which repeatedly malfunctions.

See also 
 Cyborgs in fiction
 Mechanics of Oscar Pistorius' running blades

References